The 2012 Asian Women's Volleyball Cup, so-called 2012 AVC Cup for Women was the third edition of the Asian Cup, a biennial international volleyball tournament organised by the Asian Volleyball Confederation (AVC) with Kazakhstan Volleyball Federation (KVF). The tournamen was held in Baluan Sholak Palace of Culture and Sports, Almaty, Kazakhstan from 10 to 16 September 2021.

Pools composition
The teams are seeded based on their final ranking at the 2011 Asian Women's Volleyball Championship.

Squads

Preliminary round

Pool A

|}

|}

Pool B

|}

|}

Final round

Quarterfinals

|}

5th–8th semifinals

|}

Semifinals

|}

7th place

|}

5th place

|}

3rd place

|}

Final

|}

Final standing

Team Roster
Wanna Buakaew, Piyanut Pannoy, Pleumjit Thinkaow, Onuma Sittirak, Wilavan Apinyapong, Amporn Hyapha, Tapaphaipun Chaisri, Nootsara Tomkom, Malika Kanthong, Pornpun Guedpard, Ajcharaporn Kongyot, Sontaya keawbundit
Head Coach: Kiattipong Radchatagriengkai

Awards
MVP:  Onuma Sittirak
Best Scorer:  Onuma Sittirak
Best Spiker:  Onuma Sittirak
Best Blocker:  Xu Yunli
Best Server:  Hui Ruoqi
Best Setter:  Nootsara Tomkom
Best Libero:  Marina Storozhenko

Gallery

See also
2012 Asian Men's Volleyball Cup

References

External links
Asian Volleyball Confederation

Asian Women's Volleyball Cup
Asian Cup
V
V